Freja Ravn Nielsen (born 17 February 2000) is a Danish badminton player who affiliates with KMB2010 club in Kastrup, specializing in doubles play. She started playing badminton at the age of 6 in Dragør badminton club, and entered the national team since 2016. As a junior player, she was the silver medalists at the 2018 European Junior Championships in the team and girls' doubles events.

Achievements

European Championships 
Women's doubles

European Junior Championships 
Girls' doubles

BWF World Tour 
The BWF World Tour, which was announced on 19 March 2017 and implemented in 2018, is a series of elite badminton tournaments sanctioned by the Badminton World Federation (BWF). The BWF World Tours are divided into levels of World Tour Finals, Super 1000, Super 750, Super 500, Super 300 (part of the HSBC World Tour), and the BWF Tour Super 100.

Women's doubles

BWF International Challenge/Series 
Women's doubles

  BWF International Challenge tournament
  BWF International Series tournament
  BWF Future Series tournament

References

External links 
 

2000 births
Living people
Sportspeople from Copenhagen
Danish female badminton players
21st-century Danish women